Algerian is a decorative serif digital font family, originally produced in the early 20th century by British foundry Stephenson, Blake and Co. The design for the typeface is owned by Linotype, while the name 'Algerian' is a trademark of the International Typeface Corporation.

Algerian appears in the Stephenson, Blake & Co. 1907 type specimen book on page 142, with the Algerian font as used today as the small caps lowercase to a more decorative uppercase set of initials. The solid black version of Algerian appears on the same page under the name of Gloria, with a separate shadow layer face available.

Algerian (regular) was created for Scangraphic at Letraset. Algerian Condensed was created by the Linotype library designer Alan Meeks.

URW's 1993 version of the Algerian font was one of the default fonts supplied with Microsoft Office from 1993 onwards, and has been characterised as an overused font.

Originally, the Algerian font only had capital letters, but in 2005 Michael Hagemann of FontMesa added lowercase letters to produce Algerian Mesa (as seen in the image).

In 2017 Hagemann expanded the Algerian font family to 144 styles, introducing new bold, light, outline and open faced weights including italics. This new version was released by Fontmesa under the  name of Tavern.

In March 2020 FontMesa releases two more weights in the Algerian font design under the name of Tavern, extra bold and black weights have been created making this a five weight font family with 192 styles.

Also in March 2020 FontMesa released a weathered rough edged version of Algerian under the name Bay Tavern with an alternate version called Bayside Tavern, together they add another 144 font styles to the family.

Algerian has been most notably used as the typeface in the logo of Patrón tequila since 1989.

In September 2020 FontMesa released a Mexican style version of Algerian under the name Taco which is a multi layered font family including 20 styles.

References

Display typefaces
Linotype typefaces
Serif typefaces
Digital typefaces
Stephenson Blake typefaces
Typefaces and fonts introduced in 1908
Typefaces and fonts introduced in 1988